Arte de la lengua mexicana is a little-known grammar of the Nahuatl language by Joseph Augustin Aldama y Guevara published in 1754.

Aldama y Guevara's Arte is mostly derivative of previously published grammars of Nahuatl, particularly Horacio Carochi's Arte de la lengua mexicana con la declaracion de los adverbios della.

Aldama y Guevara marks the saltillo with a circumflex accent over the preceding vowel at the end of a word, or a grave accent over the preceding vowel elsewhere, and marks long vowels with an acute accent (in contrast to Carochi's macron).

Notes

References

External links
 Aldama y Guevara's Arte de la lengua mexicana on Google Book Search

1754 books
Nahuatl dictionaries and grammars